Easy Going Gordon is a 1925 silent action film/comedy drama directed by Duke Worne and still exists.

It is preserved at the Library of Congress.

Cast
Ashton Dearholt - Gordon Palmer (*billed as Richard Holt)
Kathryn McGuire - Aileen Merton
J. Gordon Russell - Slung Williams (as Gordon Russell)
Fernando Galvez - Beef O'Connell
Roy Cushing - Judson
Harris Gordon - George Elvin

References

External links
Easy Going Gordon @ IMDb.com
AllMovie.com

1925 films
American silent feature films
Films directed by Duke Worne
American black-and-white films
American action comedy-drama films
1920s action comedy-drama films
1927 comedy films
1925 comedy films
1925 drama films
1927 drama films
1927 films
1920s American films
Silent comedy-drama films
Silent American drama films
Silent American comedy films